The 2016 presidential campaign of Martin O'Malley, the 61st Governor of Maryland, was formally launched on May 30, 2015 as Governor O'Malley announced his intention to seek the Democratic Party nomination for the presidency of the United States in the 2016 presidential election. On February 1, 2016, he suspended his campaign after a poor showing in the Iowa caucuses.

O'Malley and Jim Webb would switch places for third place in the polling, behind Hillary Clinton and Bernie Sanders until Webb dropped out. O'Malley dropped out of the race after receiving only 0.54% in the Iowa caucuses.

Background

First elected Mayor of Baltimore in 1999, O'Malley was reelected as mayor in 2003. Considering a run for governor in 2002, he instead focused on his mayoralty. In 2006, nearing the end of his second term as mayor, O'Malley announced his candidacy for Governor of Maryland, an office he would win by a sizeable margin. He ran against incumbent Republican Bob Ehrlich. O'Malley was reelected by a wider margin in a rematch against former Governor Bob Ehrlich in 2010.

Prior presidential elections

During the 2008 Democratic Presidential primaries, O'Malley endorsed then-U.S. Senator Hillary Clinton over then-Senator Barack Obama. O'Malley served as the chair of Clinton's campaign in Maryland.

2016 election

O'Malley had been seen as a potential presidential candidate since at least November 2012. In the next month, he said that Clinton, who launched her own 2016 campaign, would be a "great president", brushing off questions about his own potential candidacy and commenting that he would have to do "a lot of soul-searching and discernment and introspection."

Campaign

The day prior to his announcement, May 29, O'Malley released a video of himself strumming the presidential fanfare "Hail to the Chief" on his guitar, alluding to his impending announcement. The following day, May 30, he launched his campaign at a scheduled rally in Baltimore, Maryland.

On January 20, 2016, the Federal Election Commission announced that his campaign would receive $846,365.09 in federal matching funds, on top of an initial $100,000 the campaign received after qualifying for matching funds. In November 2015, O'Malley became the first 2016 presidential candidate to be declared eligible by the Commission to receive federal matching funds.

On February 1, 2016, O'Malley announced the suspension of his campaign after a poor showing in the Iowa caucuses.

On June 9, 2016, O'Malley endorsed Hillary Clinton.

Positions

Living wage

During a speech at Harvard's Institute of Politics, O'Malley stated his support for a $15 minimum wage, claiming that it will "fuel economic growth, greater consumer demand." He is also careful to refer to his support for a "living wage" rather than a "minimum wage." During his final year serving as the Governor of Maryland, O'Malley signed a bill to gradually raise the minimum wage to $10.10 an hour. This followed a 2007 "living wage" law requiring government contractors to pay their employees significantly more than the minimum wage; the exact level of wage increase varied from county to county depending on the cost of living.

Financial regulation
O'Malley has made financial regulation a significant plank of his platform, placing such great emphasis on it that he has been nicknamed "the Glass-Steagall candidate." This name also stems from his strong support for the reinstatement of the provision of the Glass-Steagall Act separating commercial and investment banking. O'Malley favors breaking up the nation's biggest financial institutions in order to prevent a repeat of the 2008 financial crisis, in which a number of banks were declared "too big to fail."

Immigration reform

Many in the Latino community consider O'Malley a strong ally on immigration reform. For instance, Congressman Luis Gutiérrez called him a "champion" of immigration in 2014 when the two were working to oppose the White House's deportation policy. O'Malley's support for allowing minors escaping violence in their home countries to stay in the United States put him at odds with the White House, which favored sending them home. When he was Governor of Maryland, O'Malley signed a statewide DREAM Act allowing young illegal immigrants to pay in-state college tuition and to a bill to get driver's licenses.

Gun control 
O'Malley is a gun control advocate. In May 2013 he signed the Firearm Safety Act which bans magazines that hold more than 10 bullets; bans 45 types of semiautomatic rifles; and requires people seeking to buy any gun other than a hunting rifle or shotgun to obtain a license, submit fingerprints to police, undergo a background check and pass classroom and firing-range training in Maryland. He is calling for a national assault weapons ban. O'Malley says that he is "pissed" about the gun control climate and that Congress is not doing anything about it.

Right-to-vote amendment 
O'Malley in August 2015 marked the 50th anniversary of the Voting Rights Act in South Carolina by calling for a constitutional amendment to "protect every citizen's right to vote, once and for all." He added that "Passing a constitutional amendment that enshrines that right... will give U.S. courts the clarity they need to strike down Republican efforts to suppress the vote."

Fiscal policy
O'Malley generally promotes fiscally progressive economic policies.

Endorsements

 Organizations
Australian Young Labor, NSW Chapter

U.S. Congress
Gary Hart, Senator from Colorado (1975–1987)
Joseph Tydings, Senator from Maryland (1965–1971)
Eric Swalwell, Representative from California's 15th congressional district (2013–present)
Michael D. Barnes, Representative from Maryland's 8th congressional district (1979–1987)
Berkley Bedell, Representative from Iowa's 6th congressional district (1975–1987)
John Wiley Bryant, Representative from Texas's 5th congressional district (1983–1997)
John Joseph Cavanaugh III, Representative from Nebraska's 2nd congressional district (1977–1981)

U.S. state officials
Jim Folsom Jr., 50th Governor of Alabama (1993-1995)
Parris Glendening, 59th Governor of Maryland (1995–2003)
Harry Hughes, 57th Governor of Maryland (1979–1987)
Brian Schweitzer, 23rd Governor of Montana (2005–2013)
Eliot Spitzer, 54th Governor of New York (2007–2008)
Brian Frosh, 46th Attorney General of Maryland (2015–present)
Chris Gorman, 46th Attorney General of Kentucky (1992–1996)
Daniel Hynes, 6th Illinois Comptroller (1999–2011)
Jonathan Miller, 39th Kentucky State Treasurer (2000–2008)

U.S. municipal officials
Chris Abele, 6th Executive of Milwaukee County (2011–present)
Rushern Baker, 7th Prince George's County, Maryland Executive (2010-2018)
Joseph Curtatone, 35th Mayor of Somerville, Massachusetts (2004–present)
Kevin B. Kamenetz, 12th Baltimore County Executive (2010-2018)
Isiah Leggett, 6th Montgomery County, Maryland Executive (2006-2018)
Manny Diaz, 31st Mayor of Miami (2001–2009)
C. Jack Ellis, 40th Mayor of Macon, Georgia (1999–2007)
Mike Fahey, 49th Mayor of Omaha (2001–2009)
Oscar Goodman, 21st Mayor of Las Vegas (1999–2011)
Thomas J. Murphy Jr., 57th Mayor of Pittsburgh (1994–2006)
Kurt Schmoke, 46th Mayor of Baltimore (1987–1999)
Robert W. Curran, Baltimore city councilor(1995-2016)
Tom Hucker, Montgomery County, Maryland councilor (2014–present)
Matt O'Malley, Boston city councilor (2010–present)
Bill Green, Philadelphia city councilor (2008–2014)

State legislators
Rich Taylor, Iowa state senator
Nelson Torres Yordán, Maryland state delegate (2013-2016)
Charles Townsend, New Hampshire state representative
Ronald N. Young, Maryland state senator (2011–present)
Boyd Brown, South Carolina state representative (2008–2012)
Peter Burling, New Hampshire state senator (2004–2008)
Betsy Burtis, New Hampshire state representative
Ginger Crocker, South Carolina state representative (1978–1984)
Gerard F. Doherty, Massachusetts state representative (1957–1965)
Ann Marie Doory, Maryland state delegate (1987–2010)
Steve Lathrop, Nebraska state legislator (2007–2015)
Maureen Mann, New Hampshire state representative (2008–2010)
Charlotte Pritt, West Virginia state delegate (1980-1984), West Virginia state senator (1984-1996), Democratic nominee for Governor (1996)
Andrew Martin, Nevada state assemblyman (2013–2015)
Catherine Mulholland, New Hampshire state representative
David Schapira, Arizona state senator (2011–2013)
Paul Weissmann, Colorado Senate (2003–2011)
Peter Murphy, Maryland state delegate (2007-2014)
Carlos Bianchi Angleró, Puerto Rico state representative
Bruce Bearinger, Iowa state representative
Tod Bowman, Iowa state senator (2011-2019)
Talmadge Branch, Maryland state delegate (1995–present)
Benjamin Brooks, Maryland state delegate
Ramón Luis Cruz, Puerto Rico state representative (2013–present)
William Cunningham, Illinois state senator (2013–present)
Michael Driscoll, Pennsylvania state representative
Kathleen M. Dumais, Maryland state delegate (2003–present)
Bill Ferguson, Maryland state senator (2011–present)
Craig Ford, Alabama state representative (2001–present)
William Frick, Maryland state delegate (2007-2019)
Barbara A. Frush, Maryland state delegate (1995-2019)
Tawanna P. Gaines, Maryland state delegate (2001-2019)
Anne Healey, Maryland state delegate (1991–present)
Frank Heffron, New Hampshire state representative
César Hernández Alfonzo, Puerto Rico state representative (2013-2017)
Patricia Higgins, New Hampshire state representative
Bruce Hunter, Iowa state representative (2003–present)
Dan Kelley, Iowa state representative (2011-2017)
Kevin Kinney, Iowa state senator
Karen Lewis Young, Maryland state delegate
Mary Ann Lisanti, Maryland state delegate (2015–present)
John Mann, New Hampshire state representative
Charlie McConkey, Iowa state representative
Nathaniel McFadden, Maryland state senator (1995–present)
Jorge Suárez Cáceres, Puerto Rico state senator (2008-2013)
Karen S. Montgomery, Maryland state senator (2011-2016)
Sonia Pacheco, Puerto Rico state representative (2013-2017)
Andrew Platt, Maryland state delegate
Vincent Sheheen, South Carolina state senator) (2004–present)

 Notable individuals
Yvette Lewis, Maryland DNC member
Terry Lierman, former MD Dem. Party Chair
LuAnn Pedrick, Iowa DNC member
 Dropkick Murphys, punk band
 Timothy Simons, actor
Phil Noble, entrepreneur
Ted Sarandos, Netflix executive
Lyndon LaRouche, political activist and founder of the LaRouche movement

References

 

2016 Democratic Party (United States) presidential campaigns
2016 Presidential campaign